The Daily Currant was an American satirical news blog that focused on politics, technology, and entertainment. A number of its satirical stories have been taken for true news reports by press.

The Daily Currant was a competitor to The Onion. According to Quantcast, the site garnered over 1.5 million page views a month.

As of November 22, 2016, the site is no longer in operation.

Content
Several Daily Currant articles have been reported by established news organizations, sometimes as fact.

"Rick Santorum on Grindr"

On July 3, 2012, the site published a satirical article claiming that Rick Santorum has been caught using gay dating app Grindr by a journalist during an interview; in the article, Santorum admitted to using the app, but stated that he thought it was for finding the nearest coffee shop. Mashable later published an article "Satirical Post About Santorum and Grindr Fools the Web".

"George Bush Accidentally Votes for Obama"

On November 6, 2012, the site published a satirical article claiming that former president George W. Bush had accidentally voted for Barack Obama because he couldn't figure out how to properly use his voting machine. The article was reported as fact by news outlets in Texas, "went viral" on the internet, and appeared on the website of La Repubblica, Italy's largest national newspaper.

Todd Akin hoax
Another story to receive wide publicity and belief was "Todd Akin Claims Breastmilk Cures Homosexuality", attributing beliefs to the conservative US congressman Todd Akin. The article was widely shared on social media, with many people believing it was true.

"Paul Krugman Declares Personal Bankruptcy"
On March 6, 2013, the site published a satirical article which said that the Nobel Prize–winning economist Paul Krugman had filed for bankruptcy. Breitbart mistook the story as being true; it later deleted the post without explanation.

"Message from God on Mars"
Viral e-mails and Facebook posts claimed in 2013 that NASA's Curiosity rover had found gigantic stone tablets in a cave near Aeolis Mons that were marked with the Ten Commandments and the phrase "I Am Real". However, this was a hoax that originated as a satirical Daily Currant article.

"Marijuana Overdoses Kill 37 in Colorado on First Day of Legalization"
A story concocted shortly after recreational marijuana became purchasable in Colorado claimed that 37 people had died of marijuana overdose thus far, with the death toll expected to reach as high as 300 by the following week. The article contained numerous references to fictional characters including one to Breaking Bad's Jesse Pinkman. The article's satirical nature was not understood by some, including the Swedish Minister for Justice, Beatrice Ask, and Annapolis Police Department Chief Michael A. Pristoop.

See also
 List of satirical magazines
 List of satirical news websites
 List of satirical television news programs

References

External links
 

American satirical websites
Internet properties established in 2012
2012 establishments in the United States